Arceo is a Spanish surname. Notable people with this surname include:

 Enrique Escalante Arceo (born 1969), Mexican politician
 Janet Arceo (born 1948), Mexican actress and TV presenter
 Leonardo Magallón Arceo (born 1954), Mexican politician
 Liwayway Arceo (1924–1999), Filipino fictionist, journalist, radio scriptwriter and editor
 Norberto Arceo (born 1943), Filipino cyclist
 Sergio Méndez Arceo (1907–1992), Mexican Roman Catholic bishop

Places

Spain 
 Arceo, hamlet in Valle de Mena
 San Vicenzo de Arceo, civil parish in Boimorto